Gerran Lyn Howell (born 25 February 1991) is a Welsh actor, director and writer of short films, best known for playing "Vladimir Dracula" in Young Dracula, a CBBC television series that initially aired in 2006.

Early life
Howell was born in Barry, Wales. He attended Barry Comprehensive School (an all-boys secondary school with a mixed sixth form). He trained at ATSLI improvisation workshop in Cardiff at a young age, and later went on to train at the Royal Academy of Dramatic Art in London. He initially appeared in a short cinema advert warning about the dangers of swimming in Welsh Reservoirs, and in a short film by Ellis Watts.

Career

Young Dracula
The show revolves around 13-year-old Vlad and his family, who happen to be vampires, as they try to live in a small, rural Welsh town after they moved there from Transylvania. The first two series were broadcast in 2006–2008. The third and fourth series were broadcast in 2011–2012 in which Gerran plays a 17-year-old Vlad, four years on, now with full vampire powers which he must learn to control. The fifth and concluding series was shown in early 2014.

Gerran, and co-star from Young Dracula, Letty Butler were a part of the Bake a Difference Appeal on Blue Peter and he filmed some behind the scenes footage of Young Dracula. He also appeared on Inside Out North West during a short behind the scenes at Young Dracula sketch. Gerran was also interviewed by Letty Butler about the show and he also did a short tutorial in character as Vlad on how to spot a vampire.

In January 2012, Gerran's character 'Vlad' in Young Dracula was voted in the SFX vampire poll, ranking at number 17 in the top 50 vampires.

Other work
Gerran has also appeared in a few short films and television shows, appearing as "Niall Andrews" and "Rory Brothwick" in Casualty (2006 & 2012). As well as Some Girls episode 2 as "Ryan".

In 2011, he appeared as "Ernesto" in an episode of the CBBC drama The Sparticle Mystery and returned in series 2 (which was aired in February 2013). He has also returned for series 3 of The Sparticle Mystery (which aired January 2014). Gerran also guest starred in Casualty in January 2012, as a new character alongside actor Billy Boyd.

He appeared on CBBC's Hacker Time and 12 Again, with Young Dracula co-star Clare Thomas, during 2012.

In addition to his work on-screen, he has also recorded voice-overs for radio adverts and video games.

In 2019, Howell appeared in the miniseries Catch-22 as Kid Sampson.

Gerran appeared as a private Parry in the 2019 film 1917.

In 2022, Howell starred in Freedom's Path as William, a Union soldier who befriends a runaway slave, played by RJ Cyler.

Filmography

Film

Television

Video games

References

External links

1991 births
Living people
Welsh male television actors
People from Barry, Vale of Glamorgan
People educated at Barry Comprehensive School
Welsh people of English descent
Welsh male video game actors
Alumni of RADA
21st-century Welsh male actors